Aunt Mary's Bottom is an 8.62 hectare biological Site of Special Scientific Interest in Dorset, England notified in 1991.

Sources
 English Nature citation sheet for the site (accessed 10 August 2006)

External links
 English Nature website (SSSI information)

Sites of Special Scientific Interest in Dorset
Sites of Special Scientific Interest notified in 1991